Peter Gilbert (born 31 December 1948) is a former Australian rules footballer who played with Carlton in the Victorian Football League (VFL).

Notes

External links 

Peter Gilbert's profile at Blueseum

1948 births
Carlton Football Club players
Australian rules footballers from Victoria (Australia)
Living people